The Windows Pioneers are the seven individuals who received awards from Microsoft in 1994 in recognition of their contributions to Microsoft Windows. Bill Gates presented each pioneer with an award.

The seven Windows Pioneers were:

 Alan Cooper – the "father of Visual Basic"
 Lyle Griffin – created Micrografx Designer, the earliest graphics application for Windows
 Joe Guthridge – led the development of Samna Amí, the first Windows word processor, later renamed Lotus Word Pro
 Ted Johnson – led the development of PageMaker desktop publishing software. Co-founder of Visio Corporation
 Ian Koenig – led the development of the Reuters Terminal financial information software
 Ray Ozzie – created Lotus Notes. Would later (2005–2010) serve as Microsoft's Chief Software Architect
 Charles Petzold – author of Programming Windows series from Microsoft Press, as well as many other programming books for Microsoft

References

External links
Ted Johnson bio on Microsoft's site 

History of Microsoft